The Macedonian Figure Skating Championships are the figure skating national championships held annually to crown the national champions the Republic of North Macedonia. Skaters compete in the disciplines of men's singles and ladies' singles. Not every discipline has been held in every year due to a lack of participants. The national competition is part of the competition "Skopje on Ice". Having done two classifications, one for participants from North Macedonia and one for all participants.

Senior medalists

Men

Result Details

Ladies - Free Skating only 
Result Details

Junior medalists

Men 

Result Details

Ladies - Free Skating only 

Result Details

Advanced novices medalists

Advanced Novices Boys - Free Skating only 

Result Details

Advanced Novices Girls - Free Skating only 

Result Details

References

External links
 Skopje on ice 2017
 Федерација за Лизгачки Спортови на Макед&#108
 Skopje on Ice 2020

Figure skating national championships